Cristian Alonso Riquelme Piña (born 14 October 2003) is a Chilean professional footballer who plays as a left-back for Chilean Primera División side Everton de Viña del Mar.

Club career
As a child, Riquelme represented his hometown team, Casablanca, and faced Everton de Viña del Mar. After this match, he joined Everton youth system at the age of 13. He made his professional debut in the 2021 Chilean Primera División match against Unión La Calera on November 14, 2021, and signed his first professional contract in February 2022.

International career
Riquelme represented Chile at under-17 level in both the 2019 South American Championship, playing all the matches, and the 2019 FIFA World Cup, playing four matches. Since 2021, he has been frequently called up to training microcycles of Chile U20. At under-20 level, he made his debut in the friendly match versus Peru U20 on 14 July 2022.

Personal life
He has stated that his football idol is Andrew Robertson.

References

External links
 
 Cristian Riquelme at playmakerstats.com (English version of ceroacero.es)

2003 births
Living people
People from Casablanca, Chile
Chilean footballers
Chile youth international footballers
Chile under-20 international footballers
Association football forwards
Everton de Viña del Mar footballers
Chilean Primera División players